Respiratory Care Week is a week set to honor and recognize respiratory therapists. Respiratory Care Week is celebrated internationally but most notably in Canada and the United States. Respiratory Care Week is usually the last full week of October. United States President Ronald Reagan proclaimed the first week dedicated to honoring respiratory therapists in 1982. Originally November 7 through November 13, 1982

Previous dates 
 1982: November 7 — November 13
 1983: September 15 — October 1
 2011: October 23 — October 29

last full week of October (Sunday through Saturday)

See also 
 International Nurses Day

References 

Respiratory therapy
Pulmonology